Adnan Bešić (born 28 March 1991) is a Slovenian footballer who plays for SVG Bleiburg.

External links

Profile at Prvaliga 

1991 births
Living people
People from Postojna
Slovenian people of Bosnia and Herzegovina descent
Slovenian people of Bosniak descent
Slovenian footballers
Association football forwards
Slovenian PrvaLiga players
NK Domžale players
NK Olimpija Ljubljana (2005) players
NK Aluminij players
NK Krka players
SVG Bleiburg players
Slovenian expatriate footballers
Slovenian expatriate sportspeople in Austria
Expatriate footballers in Austria
Slovenia under-21 international footballers
Slovenia youth international footballers